Manolo Galván (13 March 1947 – 16 May 2013) was a Spanish singer-songwriter. He was born in Crevillent, but settled in Argentina after 1981. He died in Buenos Aires, aged 66.

Discography
 1972: Mis inquietudes
 1973: En cualquier lugar
 1974: Te quise, te quiero y te querré
 1975: Mi única razón
 1976: Mi público
 1977: Esperando el amanecer
 1978: El ganador
 1979: Una copa conmigo
 1980: Cada mujer un templo
 1981: Ámame
 198?: A mis amigos;
 1983: Me llaman «el Calavera»
 1984: Pasajero de la noche
 1985: Un caballo azul
 1986: Suspiros de amante
 1987: A mi edad
 199?: El amor de mi vida
 1994: Amor caliente
 1997: Recuerdos
 1998: Amor de cada día
 2003: Alumbra alumbrando
 2005: Clásicos inolvidables

References

1947 births
2013 deaths
20th-century Spanish musicians